Marie of Savoy (1411 – 1469) was a Duchess of Milan by marriage to Filippo Maria Visconti.

She was a daughter of Amadeus VIII, Duke of Savoy (later the Antipope Felix V) and Mary of Burgundy. She married Filippo Maria Visconti, the Duke of Milan in 1428. They had no children.

Ancestry

References

Sources

External links

1411 births
1479 deaths
Duchesses of Milan
House of Savoy
15th-century Italian women